Hypselodoris is a genus of colourful sea slugs or dorid nudibranchs, marine gastropod mollusks in the family Chromodorididae. Modern usage follows a more restricted view of which species belong in this genus so there are numerous genus transfers.

Species
Species in the genus Hypselodoris include:

 Hypselodoris alboterminata  Gosliner & Johnson, 1999
 Hypselodoris alburtuqali Gosliner & Johnson, 2018
 Hypselodoris apolegma (Yonow, 2001)
 Hypselodoris babai  Gosliner & Behrens, 2000
 Hypselodoris bennetti (Angas, 1864)
 Hypselodoris bertschi  Gosliner & Johnson, 1999
 Hypselodoris bollandi  Gosliner & Johnson, 1999
 Hypselodoris brycei Gosliner & Johnson, 2018
 Hypselodoris bullockii (Collingwood, 1881)
 Hypselodoris capensis (Barnard, 1927)  - Cape dorid
 Hypselodoris carnea (Bergh, 1889) 
 Hypselodoris cerisae Gosliner & Johnson, 2018
 Hypselodoris confetti Gosliner & Johnson, 2018
 Hypselodoris decorata Risbec, 1928
 Hypselodoris dollfusi  (Pruvot-Fol, 1933)
 Hypselodoris emma  Rudman, 1977
 Hypselodoris festiva A. Adams, 1861
 Hypselodoris flavomarginata Rudman, 1995
 Hypselodoris fucata  Gosliner & Johnson, 1999
 Hypselodoris ghardaqana (Gohar & Aboul-Ela, 1957)
 Hypselodoris godeffroyana (Bergh, 1877)
 Hypselodoris iacula Gosliner & Johnson, 1999
 Hypselodoris iba Gosliner & Johnson, 2018
 Hypselodoris imperialis (Pease, 1860) 
 Hypselodoris infucata (Ruppell & Leuckart, 1828)
 Hypselodoris insulana  Gosliner & Johnson, 1999
 Hypselodoris jacksoni  Wilson & Willan, 2007
 Hypselodoris juniperae Gosliner & Johnson, 2018
 Hypselodoris kaname  Baba, 1994
 Hypselodoris kanga  Rudman, 1977
 Hypselodoris katherinae Gosliner & Johnson, 2018
 Hypselodoris krakatoa  Gosliner & Johnson, 1999
 Hypselodoris lacteola  Rudman, 1995
 Hypselodoris lacuna Gosliner & Johnson, 2018
 Hypselodoris maculosa  (Pease, 1871)
 Hypselodoris maridadilus Rudman, 1977
 Hypselodoris maritima  (Baba, 1949)
 Hypselodoris melanesica Gosliner & Johnson, 2018
 Hypselodoris nigrolineata  (Eliot, 1904)
 Hypselodoris nigrostriata (Eliot, 1904)
 Hypselodoris obscura Stimpson, 1855
 Hypselodoris paradisa Gosliner & Johnson, 2018
 Hypselodoris paulinae  Gosliner & Johnson, 1999
 Hypselodoris peasei (Bergh, 1860)
 Hypselodoris perii Gosliner & Johnson, 2018
 Hypselodoris placida  (Baba, 1949)
 Hypselodoris pulchella (Rüppell & Leuckart, 1828) 
 Hypselodoris purpureomaculosa Hamatani, 1995
 Hypselodoris regina  Marcus & Marcus, 1970
 Hypselodoris reidi  Gosliner & Johnson, 1999
 Hypselodoris roo Gosliner & Johnson, 2018
 Hypselodoris rosans (Bergh, 1889) 
 Hypselodoris rositoi Gosliner & Johnson, 2018
 Hypselodoris rudmani  Gosliner & Johnson, 1999
 Hypselodoris sagamiensis  (Baba, 1949)
 Hypselodoris saintvincentia Burn, 1962 
 Hypselodoris shimodaensis Baba, 1994
 Hypselodoris skyleri Gosliner & Johnson, 2018
 Hypselodoris tryoni (Garrett, 1873)
 Hypselodoris variobranchia Gosliner & Johnson, 2018
 Hypselodoris violabranchia  Gosliner & Johnson, 1999
 Hypselodoris violacea Gosliner & Johnson, 2018
 Hypselodoris whitei (Adams & Reeve, 1850)
 Hypselodoris yarae Gosliner & Johnson, 2018
 Hypselodoris zebrina  (Alder & Hancock, 1864)
 Hypselodoris zephyra Gosliner & Johnson, 1999

 Species brought into synonymy
 Hypselodoris acriba Marcus & Marcus, 1967: synonym of Felimare acriba (Ev. Marcus & Er. Marcus, 1967)
 Hypselodoris aegialia (Bergh, 1904): synonym of Felimare agassizii (Bergh, 1894)
 Hypselodoris agassizii  (Bergh, 1894): synonym of Felimare agassizii (Bergh, 1894)
 Hypselodoris alaini Ortea, Espinosa & Buske, 2013: synonym of Felimare alaini (Ortea, Espinosa & Buske, 2013)
 Hypselodoris andersoni  Bertsch & Gosliner 1989: synonym of Hypselodoris peasei
 Hypselodoris bayeri (Ev. Marcus and Er. Marcus, 1967) : synonym of Felimare bayeri Ev. Marcus & Er. Marcus, 1967
 Hypselodoris bilineata  (Pruvot-Fol, 1953): synonym of Felimare bilineata (Pruvot-Fol, 1953)
 Hypselodoris californiensis (Bergh, 1879)  - California blue doris: synonym of Felimare californiensis (Bergh, 1879)
 Hypselodoris cantabrica  Bouchet & Ortea, 1980: synonym of Felimare cantabrica (Bouchet & Ortea, 1980)
 Hypselodoris ciminoi Ortea, Valdes & Garcia-Gomez, 1996: synonym of Felimare ciminoi (Ortea & Valdés, 1996)
 Hypselodoris coelestis (Deshayes in Fredol, 1865): synonym of Hypselodoris orsinii (Vérany, 1846)
 Hypselodoris cuis Er. Marcus, 1965: probably a synonym of Hypselodoris maculosa
 Hypselodoris daniellae Kay & Young, 1969: synonym of Thorunna daniellae (Kay & Young, 1969)
 Hypselodoris decorata (Risbec, 1928): synonym of Hypselodoris maculosa (Pease, 1871)
 Hypselodoris edenticulata (White, 1952): synonym of Felimare picta (Schultz in Philippi, 1836)
 Hypselodoris elegans (Cantraine, 1835): synonym of Hypselodoris picta (Schultz in Philippi, 1836)
 Hypselodoris epicuria Basedow & Hedley, 1905: synonym of Chromodoris epicuria (Basedow & Hedley, 1905)
 Hypselodoris espinosai Ortea & Valdes in Ortea, Valdes & Garcia-Gomez, 1996: synonym of Felimare espinosai (Ortea & Valdés, 1996)
 Hypselodoris festiva (Angas, 1864): synonym of Mexichromis festiva (Angas, 1864)
 Hypselodoris fontandraui  (Pruvot-Fol, 1951): synonym of Felimare fontandraui (Pruvot-Fol, 1951)
 Hypselodoris fortunensis Ortea, Espinosa & Buske, 2013: synonym of Felimare fortunensis (Ortea, Espinosa & Buske, 2013)
 Hypselodoris fregona Ortea & Caballer, 2013: synonym of Felimare fregona (Ortea & Caballer, 2013)
 Hypselodoris gasconi  Ortea in Ortea, Valdés & García-Gómez, 1996: synonym of Felimare gasconi (Ortea, 1996)
 Hypselodoris ghiselini Bertsch, 1978: synonym of Felimare ghiselini (Bertsch, 1978)
 Hypselodoris gofasi Ortea & Valdés, 1996: synonym of Felimare gofasi (Ortea & Valdés, 1996)
 Hypselodoris juliae  Felimare juliae 
 Hypselodoris katerythros Yonow, 2001: synonym of Hypselodoris emma Rudman, 1997
 Hypselodoris kayae Young, 1967: synonym of Verconia simplex (Pease, 1871)
 Hypselodoris koumacensis Rudman, 1995: synonym of Hypselodoris kaname Baba, 1994
 Hypselodoris kulonba Burn, 1966: synonym of Digidentis kulonba (Burn, 1966)
 Hypselodoris lajensis Troncoso, Garcia & Urgorri, 1998: synonym of Hypselodoris picta lajensis Troncoso, Garcia & Urgorri, 1998
 Hypselodoris lalique Ortea & Caballer, 2013: synonym of Felimare lalique (Ortea & Caballer, 2013)
 Hypselodoris lapislazuli  (Bertsch & Ferreira, 1971): synonym of Felimare lapislazuli (Bertsch & Ferreira, 1974)
 Hypselodoris lilyeveae Alejandrino & Valdes, 2006: synonym of Felimare lilyeveae (Alejandrino & Valdés, 2006)
 Hypselodoris lineata (Souleyet, 1852): synonym of Hypselodoris maridadilus Rudman, 1977
 Hypselodoris malacitana  Luque, 1986: synonym of Felimare malacitana (Luque, 1986)
 Hypselodoris marci  Marcus, 1970: synonym of Felimare marci (Ev. Marcus, 1971)
 Hypselodoris midatlantica Gosliner, 1990: synonym of Felimare villafranca (Rissi, 1818)
 Hypselodoris mouaci (Risbec, 1930): synonym of Hypselodoris whitei (Adams & Reeve, 1850)
 Hypselodoris muniainae Ortea & Valdés, 1996: synonym of Felimare muniainae (Ortea & Valdés, 1996)
 Hypselodoris muniani Ortea & Valdes in Ortea, Valdes & Garcia-Gomez, 1996: synonym of Felimare muniainae (Ortea & Valdés, 1996)
 Hypselodoris nyalya  (Marcus & Marcus, 1967): synonym of Risbecia nyalya (Ev. Marcus & Er. Marcus, 1967) 
 Hypselodoris olgae  Ortea & Bacallado, 2007: synonym of Felimare olgae (Ortea & Bacallado, 2007)
 Hypselodoris orsinii (Verany, 1846): synonym of Felimare orsinii (Vérany, 1846)
 Hypselodoris picta (Schultz, 1836): synonym of Felimare picta (Schultz in Philippi, 1836)
 Hypselodoris pinna Ortea, 1988: synonym of Felimare pinna (Ortea, 1988)
 Hypselodoris porterae (Cockerell, 1901): synonym of  Mexichromis porterae (Cockerell, 1901)
 Hypselodoris punicea Rudman, 1995: synonym of Thorunna punicea Rudman, 1995
 Hypselodoris ruthae  Marcus & Hughes, 1974: synonym of Felimare ruthae (Ev. Marcus & Hughes, 1974)
 Hypselodoris saintvincentius Burn, 1962: synonym of Hypselodoris saintvincentia Burn, 1962
 Hypselodoris samueli Caballer & Ortea, 2012: synonym of Felimare samueli (Caballer & Ortea, 2012)
 Hypselodoris sycilla (Bergh, 1890): synonym of Felimare sycilla (Bergh, 1890)
 Hypselodoris tema Edmunds, 1981: synonym of Felimare tema (Edmunds, 1981)
 Hypselodoris tricolor (Cantraine, 1835): synonym of Felimare tricolor (Cantraine, 1835)
 Hypselodoris tryoni (Garrett, 1873): synonym of Risbecia tryoni (Garrett, 1873)
 Hypselodoris valenciennesi (Cantraine, 1841): synonym of Felimare picta (Schultz in Philippi, 1836)
 Hypselodoris vibrata (Pease, 1860): synonym of Goniobranchus vibratus (Pease, 1860)
 Hypselodoris villafranca (Risso, 1818): synonym of Felimare villafranca (Risso, 1818)
 Hypselodoris webbi (D'Orbigny, 1839): synonym of Hypselodoris picta (Schultz in Philippi, 1836)
 Hypselodoris xicoi Ortea, Valdes & Garcia-Gomez, 1996: synonym of Felimare xicoi (Ortea & Valdés, 1996)
 Hypselodoris zebra  (Heilprin, 1889): synonym of Felimare zebra (Heilprin, 1889)

References

Chromodorididae
Gastropod genera